is a railway station on the Iida Line in the village of Minamiminowa, Kamiina District Japan, operated by Central Japan Railway Company (JR Central).

Lines
Tabata Station is served by the Iida Line and is 181.0 kilometers from the starting point of the line at Toyohashi Station.

Station layout
The station consists of one ground-level side platform serving a single bi-directional track. There is no station building, but only a shelter built on top of the platform. The station is unattended.

Adjacent stations

History
Tabata Station opened on 3 November 1911. From 1911 to 1959, the name of the station was officially pronounced "Tahata". With the privatization of Japanese National Railways (JNR) on 1 April 1987, the station came under the control of JR Central. The current station building was completed in 1991.

Passenger statistics
In fiscal 2016, the station was used by an average of 166 passengers daily (boarding passengers only).

Surrounding area
The Tenryū River flows to the east side of the station.

See also
 List of railway stations in Japan

References

External links

 Tabata Station information 

Railway stations in Nagano Prefecture
Railway stations in Japan opened in 1911
Stations of Central Japan Railway Company
Iida Line
Minamiminowa, Nagano